The 1930–31 season was the 34th in the history of the Western Football League.

The Division One champions for the first time in their history were Exeter City Reserves. The winners of Division Two were Portland United. There was again no promotion or relegation between the two divisions this season.

Division One
Division One was reduced from eight to seven clubs after Bath City left the league.

Division Two
Division Two was increased from ten to seventeen clubs after seven new clubs joined:

Chippenham Town, rejoining after leaving the league in 1906.
Coleford Athletic, rejoining after leaving the league in 1922.
Petters Westland
Poole Town, rejoining after leaving the league in 1927.
Salisbury City, rejoining after leaving the league in 1929.
Street, rejoining after leaving the league in 1922.
Warminster Town

References

1930-31
4